Roscoe Conklin Born (November 24, 1950 – March 3, 2020) was an American actor and songwriter. He is best known for his roles on various television soap operas, most notably as archvillain Mitch Laurence on One Life to Live in six stints between 1985 and 2012.

Early life and education
Born was born in Topeka, Kansas.

Career
Born appeared most often in daytime television, first appearing on  Ryan's Hope as troubled mob heir Joe Novak from 1981 to 1983 and again in 1988. He next portrayed villain Mitch Laurence on One Life to Live from 1985 to 1987 then again from 2002 to 2003, reprising the role once again starting in November 2009. Born appeared on Santa Barbara in his best known roles Robert Barr (1989–1991) and his twin Quinn Armitage (1990–1991), a role that earned him an Emmy Award-nomination. He was also a regular on the primetime soap Paper Dolls as Mark Bailey in 1984. From April 2005 to January 2006 and again in March 2009, Born was on The Young and the Restless in the critically acclaimed role of the evil Tom Fisher. Many of his daytime roles showcased him in evil roles, with the exception of Nick Rivers on the 1995-1997 ABC series The City. Nick was a grizzled musician, allowing Born the opportunity to perform his own material. He can be seen performing some of his more recent songs on YouTube.com: "Bob Dylan's Pepsi Blues"; "Blue State Mind, Red State Soul"; "Soldier On", a salute to our troops in Iraq and Afghanistan; and "If It Don't Stink, Don't Stir the Pot", a response to the Boy Scouts of America sex abuse scandal.  In February 2017, Born released two singles on iTunes via Chowderhead Records, "Let the Road Lead" and "Crazy is as Crazy Does".

In the 1980s, he also guest starred in such prime time shows as Murder, She Wrote and Midnight Caller and starred in the TV movies The Haunting of Sarah Hardy and Lady Mobster. In 1989, he had a featured role in the film Pow Wow Highway. 1970s TV appearances include The Incredible Hulk, The Six Million Dollar Man, two episodes of The Rockford Files and the TV movie Fast Friends.

Around this time Born played the dastardly Jim Thomasen on All My Children. In late 1997, he abruptly left the role and did not appear on daytime for the next several years (save bit parts on As the World Turns and Guiding Light). Born was working outside of the industry when One Life to Live rehired him from 2002 to 2003 to reprise the role of Mitch.  Born portrayed an evil prison warden on Passions in 2007, and played the contract role of Dean Trent Robbins on the NBC soap opera Days of Our Lives from May 29, 2008 to September 26, 2008.

Born studied acting at the Arena Stage workshop and made his professional acting debut for them on November 13, 1969, in the play Edith Stein. In 1979, he won a Drama-Logue Award for the play Life in the Theater.

In 1990, Born earned nominations for a Daytime Emmy and Soap Opera Digest award.

Personal life and death
From 1982 to 1990, Born was married to Ryan's Hope actress Randall Edwards. He was married to fellow Santa Barbara co-star Roberta Weiss from 1994 to 2000, and they had a daughter, Alberta.

Born died on March 3, 2020, at the age of 69. He died by suicide; his family issued a statement that said, "Roscoe has long struggled with bipolar disorder, a shadow that he succumbed to when he took his own life".

Filmography

References

External links

Roscoe Born Facebook Page

1950 births
2020 deaths
Actors from Topeka, Kansas
Male actors from Kansas
Place of death missing
American male soap opera actors
American male stage actors
American male television actors
Songwriters from Kansas
Suicides in the United States
2020 suicides
People with bipolar disorder